Max V. Shaul State Park is a  state park in Schoharie County, New York, United States. The park is located in Schoharie Valley between Breakabeen and Fultonham in the Town of Fulton, within sight of Vroman's Nose.

History
New York State made the initial purchase of land that was to become the park in 1958. Originally named Toepath Mountain Picnic Area and Campsite, the park opened on May 28, 1959.

Park description
Max V. Shaul State Park features a softball field, a playground, fishing (at Panther and Schoharie creeks), picnic grounds, and cooking and camping sites. Cross-country ski trails are available in the winter. Camping is available at 30 tent and trailer sites, and campers at Max V. Shaul State Park are permitted free access to nearby Mine Kill State Park during their stay.

The park is located on Route 30, and the southern entrance of Old Route 30 is at the park.

References

External links
 New York State Parks: Max V. Shaul State Park
 Max V. Shaul State Park map

Max V. Shaul State Park
Parks in Schoharie County, New York
1959 establishments in New York (state)